Zaragocyon is an extinct monospecific genus of hemicyonine bear from the Early Miocene of Spain.

References

Hemicyonids
Miocene carnivorans
Fossils of Spain
Fossil taxa described in 1995
Prehistoric carnivoran genera